A Ranchería is a small rural settlement

Rancharia, Rancheria, Ranchería or Rancherío may also refer to:

Communities
 Rancharia, a municipality in São Paulo, Brazil
 Rancheria, a locality in Canada's Yukon territory
 Colusa Rancheria, California
 Lower Rancheria, California
 Old Rancheria, California

Other
 Rancharia (footballer), Brazilian soccer player André dos Santos Oliveira
 Rancheria Creek (disambiguation)
 Rancheria River (disambiguation)
 Rancherio, a poem by Luis Cluzeau Mortet

See also 
 
 
 List of California Rancherias
 Ranchera
 Rancherie
 Ranchero (disambiguation)
 Rancho (disambiguation)